Dukaginzade Ahmed Pasha (d. 1515) born Progon Dukagjini was a high-ranking statesman and military commander of the Ottoman Empire in the early 16th century. He hailed from the Albanian Dukagjini family, one of the strongest in pre-Ottoman medieval Albania. 

By 1503, he had become sanjakbey of Ankara and was married to Gevherşah Hanımsultan, daughter Ayşe Sultan (daughter of Sultan Bayezid II) and Guneyi Sinan Pasha, another Ottoman Albanian general, and had with her a son Ibrahim Bey and a daughter Fatma Hanım, while his son by his first wife married Gevhermüluk Sultan, a daughter of Sultan Bayezid II. Later, he married Hafize Sultan, a daughter of Sultan Selim I. Dukaginzade Ahmed Pasha was one of the commanders who supported Prince Selim in the Ottoman succession dispute. In 1511, as a result of the large revolt of the janissaries, he became beylerbey of Anatolia. In his new position, he played an instrumental role in securing that Selim would be the next Sultan in 1512 and had an important impact in the military victory against Şehzade Ahmed, the pretender to the Ottoman throne on April 15, 1513, in Yenişehir. Dukaginzade Ahmed Pasha may have been the commander who captured Şehzade Ahmed in the battle.

By the summer of 1513, he became joined as a vizier (minister) in the Imperial Council (diwan) and was responsible for the negotiations with Venice about possible Ottoman support to Venice against H.R.E. Charles V. In 1514, Selim I began his campaign against the Safavids which culminated in the Battle of Chaldiran. At the beginning of the campaign, Dukaginzade Ahmed Pasha was at the head of the vanguard of 20,000 sipahi. His activity in the early stages of the campaign in contemporary sources is unclear, but in the battle of Chaldiran on August 23, 1514, he and the other viziers were at the centre of the battle line next to Selim. Around September 7, when the Ottoman army reached Tabriz, the Safavid capital, Dukaginzade was in the delegation which went ahead of the army in order to accept the city's surrender to Selim.

He was Grand Vizier of the empire between December 1514 and March 1515. Then he was executed by Selim I, who thought that he was involved in the ongoing revolt of the janissaries. His son, Dukakinzade Mehmed Pasha, was a governor in several regions including Egypt Eyalet. He built the Al-Adiliyah Mosque complex in Aleppo, Syria where his family was based. The El Adli Dukaginzade are his descendants.

In Ottoman sources, Dukaginzade  have been used to refer to him.

See also
 List of Ottoman Grand Viziers
 Dukakinzade Yahya bey

Sources

References

Bibliography

16th-century Grand Viziers of the Ottoman Empire
Albanian Grand Viziers of the Ottoman Empire
Grand Viziers of Selim I
Year of birth unknown
1515 deaths
Dukagjini family
Devshirme
Executed Albanian people
Executed people from the Ottoman Empire
16th-century executions by the Ottoman Empire
1510s in the Ottoman Empire
15th-century Albanian people
16th-century Albanian people